The Men's 60 kg powerlifting event at the 2004 Summer Paralympics was competed  on 22 September. It was won by Shaban Ibrahim, representing .

Final round

22 Sept. 2004, 17:15

References

M